Ərikli is a village in the Lachin District of Azerbaijan.

History 
The village was located in the Armenian-occupied territories surrounding Nagorno-Karabakh, coming under the control of ethnic Armenian forces during the First Nagorno-Karabakh War in the early 1990s. The village subsequently became part of the breakaway Republic of Artsakh as part of its Kashatagh Province, where it was known as Arakhish. It was returned to Azerbaijan as part of the 2020 Nagorno-Karabakh ceasefire agreement.

Historical heritage sites 
Historical heritage sites in and around the village include khachkars from between the 9th and 11th centuries, two cemeteries from between the 9th and 17th centuries, a 12th-century tombstone, the 12th/13th-century church of Arakhish, the church of Zorakhach from 1246, a tombstone from 1295, a 15th/16th-century rock-cut khachkar, a 16th/17th-century khachkar, and two 17th-century tombstones.

Demographics 
The village had 50 inhabitants in 2005, and 12 inhabitants in 2015.

References

External links 
 

Villages in Azerbaijan
Populated places in Lachin District